Aloys Elloy (born in 1829 in Servigny-les-Raville) was a French clergyman and bishop for the Roman Catholic Diocese of Tonga. He was appointed bishop in 1863. He died in 1878.

References 

1829 births
1878 deaths
French Roman Catholic bishops
Roman Catholic bishops of Tonga